Bret Hudson (born 2 October 1973) is an Australian gymnast. He competed at the 1996 Summer Olympics.

References

External links
 

1973 births
Living people
Australian male artistic gymnasts
Olympic gymnasts of Australia
Gymnasts at the 1996 Summer Olympics
Sportspeople from Sydney
Commonwealth Games medallists in gymnastics
Commonwealth Games gold medallists for Australia
Commonwealth Games silver medallists for Australia
Commonwealth Games bronze medallists for Australia
Gymnasts at the 1994 Commonwealth Games
Gymnasts at the 1998 Commonwealth Games
20th-century Australian people
21st-century Australian people
Medallists at the 1994 Commonwealth Games
Medallists at the 1998 Commonwealth Games